The U.S. Government Open Code Collaborative or Government Open Code Collaborative Repository was an initiative for best practice exchange among government agencies in the United States employing free software, open source, share alike and other methods of solving software-related problems in an open collaborative way. 

Launched in 2004, it was meant to be "a voluntary collaboration between public sector entities and non-profit academic institutions created for the purpose of encouraging the sharing, at no cost, of computer code developed for and by government entities where the redistribution of this code is allowed". After two years of activity, no new content has been added to its website since April 2006. 

The initiative has been criticized by open source advocates for its failure to embrace open source culture entirely by monitoring access to the code by means of a membership scheme.

References

External links
 Official website
  - Linux in Government: The Government Open Code Collaborative, a critical article in Linux Journal on the GOCC initiative

Collaboration